Prawn crackers are a deep fried snack made from starch and prawn. They are a common snack food in Southeast Asian cuisine, but they are most closely associated with Indonesia. They have also been adapted into East Asian cuisines, where the similar Japanese kappa ebisen (Japan) and Korean saeukkang (Korea) are popular snacks.

History 
According to the culinary historian Fadly Rahman, krupuk (crackers) have been around in Java since the 9th or 10th century. The Batu Pura inscription mentions krupuk rambak, which are crackers made from cow or buffalo skin, that still exist today as krupuk kulit, and are usually used in the Javanese dish krechek. Krupuk spread across the archipelago, with varying ingredients, notably fish and prawn. From Java, krupuk spread to coastal areas of Kalimantan, Sumatra, to the Malay Peninsula. The coastal peoples of Kalimantan and Sumatera later developed krupuk made of prawn and fish to make use of leftover sea products.

According to British chef Will Meyrick, krupuk crackers that use prawn appeared in Malay peninsula in the 16th century. Legend there states that leftover, crushed prawn heads from a feast were used to make prawn crackers. Around the 19th century, keropok (crackers) was mentioned in a Malay text which mentions Kuantan in Malay peninsula. Prawn crackers began to be adopted in foreign countries in the colonial era of the Dutch East Indies around 19th to early 20th century, and are considered as a complement to various Indonesian specialties. The idea of eating food with prawn crackers was brought by Dutch colonials to the Netherlands.

Preparation 

Prawn crackers are made by mixing prawns, tapioca flour and water. The mixture is rolled out, steamed, and sliced. Traditionally, to achieve maximum crispiness, raw crackers are usually sun-dried first before frying, to eliminate the moisture. Once dry, they are deep-fried in oil (which must be at high heat before cooking). In only a few seconds they expand from thumb-sized semi-transparent wafers to white fluffy crackers, much like popcorn, as water bound to the starch expands as it turns into steam.

If left in the open air for more than a few hours (depending on humidity), they start to soften and become chewy and are therefore ideally consumed within a few hours of being fried. Storing the crackers in a low-humidity environment or an airtight container will preserve the crispness.

Prawn crackers of premium quality are aromatic even without additives such as monosodium glutamate (MSG) and artificial prawn flavourings to enhance the smell and taste. The fried prawn crackers may be stored in an airtight container for up to three months without preservatives and up to about nine months depending on the amount of preservatives added.

Most varieties of prawn crackers can also be prepared in a microwave oven, in which a few discs can be cooked in less than a minute. This will usually cause them to cook and expand in a way similar to when they are deep-fried. For small quantities, this method is faster and less messy, as the crackers do not become as oily. However, this may cause the cracker to retain a stronger aroma of raw shrimp and the cracker has to be consumed within hours before it softens and loses its crispness.

Retail 

Packets of unfried prawn crackers may be purchased in east and southeast Asian groceries. In the Netherlands, Belgium, Suriname, France, Australia, South Africa, West Africa, The Middle East and the United Kingdom, they are also widely available in general supermarkets.

In the United Kingdom, Australia, Belgium, Germany and Ireland they are often given free of charge alongside take-away east or southeast Asian food orders.

Variations

Southeast Asia 

Prawn cracker is called krupuk udang in Indonesian, and is merely one variant of many sorts of krupuk recognised in Indonesian cuisine. In Indonesia the term krupuk or kerupuk is used as an umbrella term to refer to this kind of cracker. Indonesia has perhaps the largest variety of krupuk.

Krupuk udang (prawn cracker) and other types of krupuk are ubiquitous in Indonesia. Examples of popular krupuk udang brands in Indonesia include Finna and Komodo brand. To achieve maximum crunchiness, most of this pre-packed raw krupuk udang must be sun-dried first before being deep fried at home. To cook krupuk, a wok and plenty of very hot cooking oil is needed. Raw krupuk is quite small, hard, and darker in color than cooked one. Fishing towns of Sidoarjo in East Java, also Cirebon in West Java, are major producers of krupuk udang.

Prawn crackers are known as keropok in Malaysia. They are one of the most popular snacks in Malaysia and are particularly served at homes of many during festive celebrations (such as Chinese New Year and Hari Raya).

Prawn crackers are known as kropek (also spelled kropeck) in the Philippines, or by their English names "prawn crackers" or "fish crackers" (especially in mass-produced commercial versions). They are traditionally made from flour (usually tapioca flour), powdered prawns or fish, various spices, and water. Unlike in Malaysia and Indonesia, kropek is typically only eaten as a snack or as appetizers (pulutan) accompanying alcohol, similar to chicharon. They are typically dipped in spicy vinegar-based sauces, most notably sinamak (a native spicy vinegar). Kropek have also been assimilated into Filipino Chinese cuisine, often being served as a side dish to some Chinese Filipino dishes.

Sa Đéc in southern Vietnam is the home of bánh phồng tôm. The traditional snack is made of ground shrimp, sometimes mixed with cuttlefish, arrowroot flour, tapioca flour, onion, garlic, sugar, fish sauce, cracked black pepper and salt. Traditionally the dough is steamed, rolled out, cut into round chips then dried. Another method is to form rolls, steam and then slice into thin rounds before being dried. Modern production favours the oval shapes such that the chips form a "scooper" as an accompaniment to salads (gỏi and nộm). The brand Sa Giang is well known.

A variant is bánh phồng nấm flavoured with nấm hương (shiitake) or nấm rơm (straw mushroom).

Chinese cuisine 

In Chinese cuisine, prawn crackers may use food colouring (including shades of white, pale pink, green and blue), and tend to be lighter and non-spicy. However, in China they are easy to find in supermarkets, yet not popular or common in restaurants or when serving food for friends.

Prawn crackers are considered a snack food, but may accompany takeaway Chinese food in Australia, Belgium, the Netherlands, Spain, the United Kingdom, and Ireland. Shrimp chips are usually served with roasted chicken dishes in Chinese restaurants overseas (such as white cut chicken and crispy fried chicken).

The Netherlands 

Through their historical colonial ties with Indonesia, the Dutch are familiar with Indonesian foodstuffs including the Indonesian prawn crackers. Assorted types of krupuk, deep fried crackers made from starch and flavourings, such as prawn or crab, are available in many Indische, or Indo, (Dutch-Indonesian) shops in the Netherlands, which locally are called toko. Prawn crackers are also available in many of the major supermarkets. Kroepoek is a standard part of the repertoire of "Indische" (a word referring to the former Dutch East Indies, present day Indonesia; not to be confused with the Dutch word Indiaas, meaning "from India") restaurants in the Netherlands. It is also served in Chinese restaurants in Belgium and in the Netherlands.

See also 

 Fish cracker
 Kabkab
 Kiping
 Krupuk kulit, a food of similar texture and appearance made of beef skin
 List of deep fried foods

References

External links 

 

Animal-based seafood
Burmese cuisine
Chinese cuisine
Deep fried foods
Hong Kong cuisine
Indonesian snack foods
Malaysian cuisine
Philippine cuisine
Shrimp dishes
Southeast Asian cuisine
Vietnamese cuisine
Thai desserts and snacks